The Hyatt Regency Jacksonville, located at 225 East Coastline Drive, is a 19-story high-rise hotel in Jacksonville, Florida. With 951-rooms, it is the largest hotel in North Florida. At , the hotel is the 23rd tallest building in Downtown Jacksonville. Sitting adjacent to the St. Johns River, visitors have access to amenity such as the Northbank Riverwalk, Jacksonville Landing and Florida Theatre, as well as a rooftop pool.

Completed in 2001 under the Adam's Mark banner, Chartres Lodging Group purchased the hotel in 2005 and rebranded it under the Hyatt Regency flag. The hotel changed hands again in 2017 with Ramsfield Hospitality Finance's purchase of the property.

History
Opening February 1, 2001, the Adam's Mark Jacksonville (now Hyatt Regency Jacksonville) was the centerpiece of an aggressive plan to attract more conventions to Jacksonville, revitalize the riverfront and to secure a bid for Super Bowl XXXIX. The $126 million hotel consisted of 951 guest rooms, 30 meeting rooms and a total of 110,000 square feet of function space.

Prior to being incorporated into the hotel complex, what is now the Terrace Building once served as offices for the State of Florida. Designed in 1975 by local architect William Morgan as the Daniel State Office Building, the Brutalist styled building combines Pre-Columbian elements creating a modern step-pyramid design. The six terraces now serve as event space overlooking the river.

Chartres Lodging Group purchased the 966-room Adam's Mark in 2005, which it converted to a Hyatt Regency after a multimillion-dollar renovation. In 2017, Ramsfield Hospitality Finance's purchased of the property in a $24,700,000 transaction.

In 2017, Hurricane Irma forced hundreds out of the hotel after a mandatory evacuation order was placed on all buildings in Flood Zone B. The first floor of the hotel was severely damaged by flooding, closing it for several months. Finally, on February 14, 2018, the first floor lobby and main entrance were reopened to the public after six months of closure.

Gallery

See also
 Architecture of Jacksonville
 Downtown Jacksonville

References

Hyatt Hotels and Resorts
Hotel buildings completed in 2001
Downtown Jacksonville
Northbank, Jacksonville
Architecture in Jacksonville, Florida
Skyscrapers in Jacksonville, Florida
Postmodern architecture in Florida
Hotels in Jacksonville
2001 establishments in Florida